Algoma Boulevard United Methodist Church is a historic Methodist church in Oshkosh, Wisconsin, United States.  The congregation was founded in 1870.  Its building was built in 1890 and it was added to the National Register of Historic Places in 1974.

The church was designed by prominent Wisconsin architect William Waters (1843–1917).

References

External links

Churches in Winnebago County, Wisconsin
Methodist churches in Wisconsin
Churches on the National Register of Historic Places in Wisconsin
Churches completed in 1890
Romanesque Revival church buildings in Wisconsin
National Register of Historic Places in Winnebago County, Wisconsin
1890 establishments in Wisconsin